Leonard Levy (1923–2006) was an American historian.

Leonard Levy may also refer to:
Butch Levy (Leonard Bernard Levy, 1921–1999), American football player and professional wrestler
Lenny Levy (Leonard Howard Levy, 1913–1993), American baseball player
Leonard Levy (cricketer) (1939–2014), Jamaican cricketer